This article is about the particular significance of the year 1971 to Wales and its people.

Incumbents

Secretary of State for Wales – Peter Thomas
Archbishop of Wales
Glyn Simon, Bishop of Llandaff (retired)
Gwilym Williams, Bishop of Bangor (elected)
Archdruid of the National Eisteddfod of Wales – Tilsli

Events
February - Harold Charles becomes Bishop of St Asaph. 
6 May - Singer Dickie Valentine is killed in a car accident on the Glangrwyney bridge near Crickhowell.
28 May - Opening of the Llanberis Lake Railway.
1 August - It becomes legal to register marriages in the Welsh language.
date unknown 
The Welsh Nursery Schools Movement is founded in Aberystwyth.
Anglesey Aluminium opens its smelting plant on the outskirts of Holyhead.
Wylfa Nuclear Power Station becomes operational.

Arts and literature
Mary Hopkin marries record producer Tony Visconti.
Welsh performers participate in the first Festival Interceltique de Lorient in Brittany.

Awards

National Eisteddfod of Wales (held in Bangor)
National Eisteddfod of Wales: Chair - Emrys Roberts
National Eisteddfod of Wales: Crown - Bryan Martin Davies
National Eisteddfod of Wales: Prose Medal - Ifor Wyn Williams

New books

English language
Rhys Davies - Nobody Answered the Bell
John L. Hughes - Tom Jones Slept Here

Welsh language
Islwyn Ffowc Elis - Y Gromlech yn yr Haidd
Gwynfor Evans - Aros Mae
Tudor Wilson Evans - Ar Gae'r Brêc
Beti Hughes - Aderyn o Ddyfed
Alan Llwyd - Y March Hud
Eluned Phillips - Cofiant Dewi Emrys
Gwyn Thomas - Y Bardd Cwsg a'i Gefndir

Music
John Cale & Terry Riley - Church of Anthrax
Man - Do You Like It Here Now, Are You Settling In?
Iris Williams - Pererin Wyf (single)

Film
Merthyr Tydfil is one of the locations used for the filming of 10 Rillington Place.
Ruth Madoc appears in the film version of Fiddler on the Roof.

Welsh-language films
None

Broadcasting

Welsh-language television
Max Boyce appears on the Welsh-language music show, Disc a Dawn.

English-language television
Comedy duo Ryan Davies and Ronnie Williams transfer their successful Welsh language show to BBC1.
22 March - Sesame Street'''s UK debut is on HTV.
14 April - Nerys Hughes gets her big break in The Liver Birds, first aired on this date.

Sport
BBC Wales Sports Personality of the Year - John Dawes, Wales national rugby union teen and Welsh Lions
Cricket - May: In a Glamorgan home match at Sophia Gardens, Roger Davis is struck on the temple while fielding at short leg and survives largely thanks to the intervention of Dr Colin Lewis (grandfather of Rhydian Roberts).
Gymnastics - Pam Hopkins wins the British Women's Championship.
Rugby union - Wales win their sixth Grand Slam.
Sailing - Nicolette Milnes-Walker becomes the first woman to sail non-stop single-handed across the Atlantic.

Births
11 January - Tom Ward, actor
23 January - Scott Gibbs, rugby player
19 March (in Taunton) - Kirsty Williams, politician
2 April - Chico Slimani, singer
8 July - Neil Jenkins, rugby player
18 August (in Limerick) - Aphex Twin, musician
8 September - Martyn Margetson, footballer
3 October - Zoe Lyons, comedian
26 October - Damon Searle, footballer
5 November
Chris Addison, Cardiff-born comedian
Rob Jones, footballer
18 December - Jason Hughes, actordate unknownJason Walford Davies, poet and academic
Eleri Siôn, née Jones, media presenter

Deaths
2 January – Harold Jones, convicted murderer, 64
12 January – Gwenan Jones, historian and politician, 81
4 March – Ifan Gruffydd ("Y Gŵr o Baradwys"), author, 75
8 March – Harold Lloyd, American comedy actor of Welsh descent, 77
18 March – Jack Gore, Wales international rugby player, 71
9 April – Dewi Morgan, poet, scholar and journalist, 93
19 April – Thomas Evan Nicholas (Niclas y Glais), writer and political activist, 91
18 May – William Mainwaring MP, miners' leader
20 May – Waldo Williams, poet, 66
29 May – Howell Lewis, Wales international rugby player, 83
5 June – Clifford Dyment, poet, 57
5 July – Idris Jones, chemist and rugby player, 71
11 July – Brenda Chamberlain, poet and artist, 59
4 September – C. E. Vulliamy, author, 85
1 October – Bill Davies, cricketer, 65
9 November - Ceri Richards, artist, 68
27 November - Leslie Thomas, politician, 65
1 December - Jack Jenkins, Wales international rugby player, 91date unknown''
James Conway Davies, historian and palaeographer, 79
Jack Evans, footballer

See also
1971 in Northern Ireland

References

 
Wales
 Wales